Frederick Foote Johnson (April 23, 1866 – May 9, 1943) was fourth bishop of the Episcopal Diocese of Missouri.

Early life and education
Johnson was born in Newtown, Connecticut on April 23, 1866, a son of Ezra Levan Johnson and Jane Eliza Camp. He was a descendant of Nathaniel Foote. Johnson was educated at Newtown High School, St Stephen's College in Annandale, New York and the Cheshire Episcopal School. He then attended Trinity College from where he earned a Bachelor of Arts in 1894, a Master of Arts in 1897, and a Doctor of Divinity in 1906. He also studied at Berkeley Divinity School, graduated with a Bachelor of Divinity in 1897, and was awarded a Doctor of Divinity in 1906. The University of the South also awarded him a Doctor of Divinity in 1918.

Ordained ministry
Johnson was ordained deacon on November 11, 1896, by Bishop John Hazen White of Indiana, and then priest on October 15, 1897, by Bishop John Franklin Spalding in Denver, Colorado. He served as minister at St Barnabas' Church in Glenwood Springs, Colorado in 1897 and then as curate at St Stephen's Church in Colorado Springs, Colorado from 1897 till 1898. In 1898 he also briefly served as rector at Boulder, Colorado, before becoming rector of Trinity Church in Redlands, California in 1899. Between 1904 and 1905, he was a diocesan Missionary in Western Massachusetts.

Bishop
On June 8, 1905, Johnson was elected Assistant Bishop of South Dakoda, and was consecrated on November 2, 1905, by Presiding Bishop Daniel S. Tuttle. He was elected Missionary Bishop of South Dakota on October 11, 1910. A year later, in May 1911, he was elected Coadjutor Bishop of Missouri, and succeeded as diocesan bishop in 1923. He retired in 1933 and died 10 years later on May 9, 1943.

External links

References

1866 births
1943 deaths
Episcopal bishops of Missouri
People from Newtown, Connecticut
Sewanee: The University of the South alumni
Trinity College (Connecticut) alumni
Berkeley Divinity School alumni
Episcopal bishops of South Dakota